Olenus is a genus of Upper Cambrian ptychopariid trilobite.

Distribution 
Olenus can be found in the British Isles, India, Norway, Sweden, Denmark, Newfoundland, Texas, South Korea, and Australia.
 O. haimantensis occurs in the Middle Cambrian of India (upper part of the Parahio Formation, left bank of the Parahio/Barachu river, above the Moopa camping ground, Spiti).

Ecology 
Fossils of Olenus are commonly found in dark mudstones, which were deposited on the seafloor in environments with low oxygen levels. The very wide side lobes (or pleurae) are thought to have shielded extended gills, which would have helped the animal absorb the maximum amount of oxygen possible in such an environment. Evidence also suggests that Olenus and its relatives may have developed a symbiotic relationship with sulfate-reducing bacteria, either by feeding on them or by absorbing nutrients directly from them.

Taxonomy

Species previously assigned to Olenus 
 O. forficula = Ceratopyge forficula
 O. pecten = Ctenopyge pecten
 O. punctatus = Asteropyge punctata
 O. thompsoni = Olenellus thompsoni
 O. zoppii = Dolerolenus zoppii

Species that may be confused with Olenus 
 The bug Anchodelphax olenus
 The extant beetle Olenecamptus olenus.
 The fossil waterbeetle Limnoxenus olenus.
 The ant Polyrhachis olenus. 
 The ladyslipper orchid Paphiopedilum "Olenus".

Description 
Size: Up to 1.5 in (4 cm) long. It had up to 15 thoracic segments, with a narrow axis and wide pleurae.

References 

Olenina
Ptychopariida genera
Cambrian trilobites
Cambrian trilobites of Australia
Fossils of Canada
Fossils of Denmark
Fossils of India
Fossils of Norway
Fossils of South Korea
Fossils of Sweden
Fossils of Great Britain
Fossils of the United States
Paleontology in Newfoundland and Labrador
Cambrian India

Cambrian genus extinctions